Kampong Panchor Murai is a village in the south-west of Brunei-Muara District, Brunei, about  from the capital Bandar Seri Begawan. The population was 523 in 2016. It is one of the villages within Mukim Pengkalan Batu. The postcode is BH3123.

Geography 
As a village subdivision, it borders Kampong Batong to the north, Kampong Parit to the north-east, Kampong Parit to the east, Kampong Pengkalan Batu to the south-east, Kampong Wasan and Kampong Imang to the south, and Kampong Maraburong in Tutong District to the west.

Facilities 
Panchor Murai Primary school is the village primary school, whereas Panchor Murai Religious School is the village school for the country's Islamic religious primary education.

Kampong Panchor Murai Mosque is the village mosque; it was inaugurated on 14 April 1983 and can accommodate 200 worshippers.

References 

Panchor Murai